The 1887 New York state election was held on November 8, 1887, to elect the Secretary of State, the State Comptroller, the Attorney General, the State Treasurer and the State Engineer, as well as all members of the New York State Assembly and the New York State Senate.

History
The United Labor state convention met on August 17 at Syracuse, New York. Louis F. Post, the Greenback candidate for Attorney General in 1883, was elected Temporary Chairman by the Henry George faction with 91 votes over Frank J. Ferrall, a "colored delegate from New York City", who was nominated by William Penn Rogers and received 69 votes. The convention lasted another two days, and nominated Henry George for Secretary of State, Victor A. Wilder for Comptroller, Patrick H. Cummins for Treasurer, Dennis C. Feely for Attorney General, and Sylvanus H. Sweet for State Engineer. Ex-State Engineer Sweet (in office 1874-1875 as a Democrat) declined to run.

The Prohibition state convention met on August 25 at Syracuse, New York. Rev. I. K. Funk was Temporary Chairman until the choice of Henry Clay Bascom as President.

The Republican state convention met on September 14 at the Skating Rink in Saratoga Springs, New York. Seth Low was Temporary Chairman until the choice of Warner Miller as President. Frederick D. Grant was nominated for Secretary of State by acclamation. Jesse S. L'Amoreaux was nominated for Comptroller during the first ballot. James H. Carmicheal, of Buffalo, was nominated for Treasurer. Maj. James A. Dennison, of Fulton County, was nominated for Attorney General during the  first ballot. Oliver H. P. Cornell was nominated for State Engineer on the first ballot (vote: Cornell 353, Verplanck Colvin 326).

The Democratic state convention met at Saratoga Springs.

The Progressive Labor state convention met on September 28 at Webster Hall in New York City. William Penn Rogers, called the meeting to order, and made a speech repudiating Henry George and his United Labor Party. H. A. Barker was Temporary Chairman and Chairman of the day session; George Block was Chairman of the evening session. John Swinton was nominated for Secretary of State. H. A. Barker, a cigarmaker of Albany, was nominated for Comptroller. Henry Emrich, General Secretary of the Furniture Workers Union, was nominated for Treasurer. Thaddeus B. Wakeman was nominated for Attorney General. Swinton declined to run, and the convention nominated J. Edward Hall for Secretary of State.

The Greenback-Labor state convention met on October 4 at Albany, New York, and nominated Thomas K. Beecher for Secretary of State.

Results
The whole Democratic ticket was elected.

The incumbents Cook and Fitzgerald were re-elected.

Notes

Sources
The tickets: A LIST OF THE CANDIDATES ON THE VARIOUS TICKETS in NYT on November 7, 1887
Result in Queens County: THE QUEENS COUNTY VOTE in NYT on November 15, 1887
Result in New York County: COMPLETING THE CANVASS in NYT on November 22, 1887
Vote totals: OFFICIAL VOTE OF THE STATE in NYT on December 6, 1887 (subscription required)
Results: The Tribune Almanac 1888

See also
New York state elections

1887
1887 New York (state) elections